Daniel Stephen Holland (born November 5, 1955, in Tupelo, Mississippi) is a Democratic member of the Mississippi House of Representatives, representing the 16th district since 1985. He was also a contender for the Democratic nomination in Mississippi's 1st congressional district special election, 2008 but he lost the primary runoff to Travis Childers. He is of Dutch, Italian, and Native American descent.

Holland is the son of Judge Sadie Holland, who was allegedly targeted in the 2013 ricin letters incident. James Everett Dutschke, a suspect in the case, unsuccessfully ran against Holland in 2007.

Notable Legislative Incidents 
In 2007, he was instrumental to the passage of a "trigger" bill which would ban abortions in the state of Mississippi, should the Supreme Court of the United States overturn its decision in Roe v. Wade, commenting that "he was 'fed up' with the multiple 'nit picky' bills anti-abortion advocates were trying to pass to limit abortions in the state. 'I thought we will settle this once and for all (by introducing legislation to ban abortions if Roe was overturned.) You don’t have to introduce another bill.'"

In 2012, Holland submitted a Bill to the Mississippi Legislature to change the name of the Gulf of Mexico—for all official uses within the state— to the "Gulf of America". This bill is a reflection of Holland's sense of humor, and is his way of criticizing the priorities of the Republicans in the House. Similarly, he co-sponsored a bill in 2017 to donate $1 million to President Donald Trump's proposed border wall, the same year when Mississippi's operating budget was $300 million short.

Career End 
On March 24, 2017 Holland announced that his doctors had diagnosed him with dementia, and that he would not seek re-election at the end of his term in 2019. However, in 2019 Holland announced that he would seek his 10th term for the State Legislature as an Independent. He was defeated by Democratic candidate Rickey W. Thompson.

References

External links
 Official campaign website
 D. Stephen Holland at Mississippi House of Representatives
 Facebook page 
 Stephen Holland at Vote Smart
 Steve Holland at Ballotpedia
 Follow the Money – Steve Holland: 2007, 2005, and 1999 campaign contributions

1955 births
Living people
Democratic Party members of the Mississippi House of Representatives
Mississippi State University alumni
American people of Dutch descent
American people of Italian descent
Native American state legislators
Politicians from Tupelo, Mississippi
21st-century American politicians
American United Methodists